Suyumbayev Stadion is a multi-use stadium in Osh, Kyrgyzstan.  It is currently used mostly for football matches and serves as the home stadium for Alay Osh and Ak-Bura Osh of the Kyrgyzstan League.  The stadium has a capacity of 12,000 people.

External links
Stadium information

Football venues in Kyrgyzstan
Osh